Brita Hazelius (later Johansson, January 22, 1909 – March 5, 1975) was a Swedish breaststroke swimmer who competed in the 1928 Summer Olympics.

She was born in Denmark and died in Gothenburg.

In 1928 she finished sixth in the 200 metre breaststroke event.

External links
profile

1909 births
1975 deaths
Olympic swimmers of Sweden
Swimmers at the 1928 Summer Olympics
World record setters in swimming
Swedish female breaststroke swimmers